Oleksandr Kachorenko (born 26 August 1980) is a Ukrainian former professional football.

Career
He started his career for Metalist Kharkiv and played there from 1997 to 2004 when he was traded to Helios Kharkiv and became the starting goalkeeper.

References

External links 
Oleksandr Kachorenko at FC Helios

1980 births
Ukrainian footballers
Living people
FC Metalist Kharkiv players
FC Helios Kharkiv players
Association football goalkeepers
Footballers from Kharkiv